Tomorrow Stories was an American comic book series created by Alan Moore for his America's Best Comics (ABC) line, published by Wildstorm (now a subsidiary of DC Comics).

Overview
Tomorrow Stories started in August 1999 as a collection of short stories featuring the same characters (one or two) every issue. Many of these characters were often inspired by pulp magazine and comic book archetypes, such as the boy genius and the masked detective. They include:

 Cobweb – created by Moore and Melinda Gebbie
 First American – created by Moore and Jim Baikie
 Greyshirt – created by Moore and Rick Veitch
 Jack B. Quick – created by Moore and Kevin Nowlan
 Splash Brannigan – created by Moore and Hilary Barta

Issues

Individual comics

64-page specials

Collected editions
The series has been collected into two volumes:
 Book 1 collects issues #1–6 (hardback: ,).
 Book 2 collects issues #7–12 (hardback: ,).

Awards
 2000: Won "Best Anthology" Eisner Award

References

1999 comics debuts
Comics by Alan Moore
America's Best Comics titles
Eisner Award winners for Best Anthology
Comics anthologies